R/V Tioga is a coastal research vessel operated by the Woods Hole Oceanographic Institution.

Tioga is a fast coastal vessel designed to quickly take advantage of weather windows and breaking events, such as the 2004 Harmful Algae Bloom (Red Tide) outbreak.

Currently Tioga is heavily involved in the tagging and studying of the endangered right whales and the maintenance of the Martha's Vineyard Coastal Observatory.

Tioga is capable of many missions such as education, autonomous vehicle operations, coring, water sampling, diving, whale tagging, mooring deployments and recoveries, instrument deployments and is a cost-effective way to test and troubleshoot equipment before longer cruises on larger vessels.

She is the third of the Challenger class research vessels. Her sisters include the 50 foot Gulf Challenger, operated by the University of New Hampshire, the 55 foot Fay Slover, operated by the Old Dominion University,  and the 81 foot Rachel Carson operated by the University of Maryland.

References 

 RV Tioga

Woods Hole Oceanographic Institution
Research vessels of the United States
2004 ships
Ships built in Somerset, Massachusetts